The Globe KD2G Firefly was a pulsejet-powered American target drone, built by the Globe Aircraft Corporation for operation by the United States Navy in the late 1940s, seeing operational use into the mid-1950s.

Design and development
The KD2G was a mid-wing, twin-tailed aircraft of similar design to the KDG Snipe which Globe was already supplying to the Navy. A single McDonnell PJ42 pulsejet engine was mounted atop the rear of the fuselage. The fuselage was constructed of steel tubing with a duralumin monocoque covering; dural was also used for the flying surfaces. Recovery, if it survived its mission, was by a  diameter parachute; the Firefly was designed to be able to float for up to 15 minutes in the event of a water landing.

Operational history
First flying as the XKD2G-1 prototype during 1946, the KD2G-1 entered service with the United States Navy during 1947. The improved KD2G-2, powered by a Solar PJ32 pulsejet, began production in 1950; it was the first successful jet-powered target drone to be developed following the end of World War II. The KD2G remained in service through the mid-1950s, being replaced by the KD6G.

Variants
XKD2G-1
Prototype with McDonnell PJ42 engine.

KD2G-1
Production version of XKD2G-1 with 28-volt electrical system.

KD2G-2
Improved production model with Solar PJ32 engine.

Specifications (KD2G-2)

See also

References

Citations

Bibliography

KD2G
1940s United States special-purpose aircraft
Single-engined jet aircraft
Pulsejet-powered aircraft
Mid-wing aircraft
Target drones of the United States
Aircraft first flown in 1946